Congregation Kehilath Jeshurun (KJ or CKJ) is a Modern Orthodox synagogue, located on East 85th Street on the Upper East Side of the New York City borough of Manhattan. The synagogue was founded in 1872. The synagogue is closely affiliated with the Ramaz School. It shares a building with the lower school, and is across the street from the middle school.

The name Ramaz derives from the initials of Rabbi Moses Zevulun Margolies (1851–1936), the grandfather-in-law of the school's founder, Rabbi Joseph H. Lookstein (1902–1979). Rabbi Margolies served as the synagogue's rabbi from 1906 until his death in 1936. Lookstein had served as the congregation's assistant rabbi after receiving his semicha in 1926 from the Rabbi Isaac Elchanan Theological Seminary at Yeshiva University, and had assumed many of the roles as congregational leader while his grandfather was ill for many years before his death, assuming the title of senior rabbi after his grandfather's death in 1936. The current senior rabbi of the congregation, Rabbi Haskel Lookstein, is the son of Joseph Lookstein and was a member of the first class of six students at Ramaz when the school was established in 1937. Haskel Lookstein was installed as assistant rabbi on June 14, 1958, serving under his father, and became Senior rabbi after his father's death in 1979. Rabbi Elie Weinstock is another leader of the congregation.

In December 2008, it was reported that the congregation lost $3.5 million in the Bernard Madoff scandal.

In August 2015, the congregation announced that Rabbi Chaim Steinmetz would assume the role of senior rabbi as of January 1, 2016. As part of the transition, Rabbi Haskel Lookstein assumed the role of Rabbi Emeritus, Rabbi Elie Weinstock was granted the title of "Rabbi", and Rabbi Roy Feldman remained as Assistant Rabbi.

Prominent members

The Congregation is known for members who are prominent businessmen and philanthropists, including George Rohr, film producer Steven Haft, author Lisa Birnbach, the New York real estate family Kushner (patriarch Joseph Kushner and his sons Murray Kushner and Charles Kushner) and Ivanka Trump, who converted to Orthodox Judaism before she married Jared Kushner.

See also
List of investors in Bernard L. Madoff Securities

References

External links

Congregation Kehilath Jeshurun

Orthodox synagogues in New York City
Religious organizations established in 1872
Synagogues in Manhattan
Modern Orthodox synagogues in the United States
1872 establishments in New York (state)